Barband may refer to:
 Barband, Hamadan
 Barband, Markazi